Sveti Ilija is a village and municipality in Croatia in Varaždin County.

According to the 2011 census, there are 3,532 inhabitants, in the following settlements:
 Beletinec, population 956
 Doljan, population 409
 Križanec, population 324
 Krušljevec, population 230
 Seketin, population 387
 Sveti Ilija, population 615
 Tomaševec Biškupečki, population 379
 Žigrovec, population 211

The absolute majority of population are Croats. The municipality was founded in 1992.

References

External links
Municipality of Sveti Ilija

Municipalities of Croatia
Populated places in Varaždin County